The M6 motorway is the longest motorway in the United Kingdom. It begins at Junction 19 of the M1 and the western end of the A14 at the Catthorpe Interchange, near Rugby before heading north-west. It passes Coventry, Birmingham, Wolverhampton, Stoke-on-Trent, Preston, Lancaster and Carlisle before terminating at Junction 45 near Gretna. Here, just short of the Scottish border it becomes the A74(M) which continues to Glasgow as the M74. Its busiest sections are between junctions 4 and 10a in the West Midlands, and junctions 16 to 19 in Cheshire; these sections have now been converted to smart motorways.

It incorporated the Preston By-pass, the first length of motorway opened in the UK and forms part of a motorway "Backbone of Britain", running north−south between London and Glasgow via the industrial North of England. It is also part of the east−west route between the Midlands and the east-coast ports. The section from the M1 to the M6 Toll split near Birmingham forms part of the unsigned E-road E 24 and the section from the M6 Toll and the M42 forms part of E 05.

Route
The M6 motorway runs from junction 19 of the M1 and the A14 in Catthorpe near Rugby in central England. It passes Coventry, Birmingham,  Stafford, Wolverhampton and Stoke-on-Trent. The motorway has major junctions with the M56 and M62 near Warrington, giving access to Chester, Manchester and Liverpool. It also meets the M65 at Junction 29, south of Preston, which connects Blackburn and Burnley, and the M55 at junction 32, north of Preston which links it to Blackpool. The M6 then heads north past Wigan, Preston and Lancaster. After the latter two cities it passes through Cumbria with some parts very close to the edge of the Lake District with a short stretch within the national park boundaries and then passes Carlisle on its way to Gretna, before the motorway becomes the A74(M) a few hundred metres short of the Scottish border.

History

Planning and construction
The first section of the motorway and the first motorway in the country was the Preston By-pass. It was built by Tarmac Construction and opened by the Prime Minister Harold Macmillan on 5 December 1958. In January 1959 the Preston by-pass was closed because of rapid surface deterioration over a stretch of  "due to water freezing and then thawing". Motorists were diverted to the old road while the UK road research laboratory at Harmondsworth pondered the importance of surface water drainage.

The second phase of construction was completed in 1960, forming the Lancaster by-pass. In 1970, the Lancaster–Penrith link was completed, along with a short section of motorway by-passing the south of Walsall. The most northerly section of the motorway also opened in 1970, running to the designated terminus north of Carlisle.

Junction 6 in Birmingham, which opened in May 1972, is widely known as Spaghetti Junction because of its complexity and round and curvy-like design. On the elevated ground between Shap and Tebay, the north and south-bound carriages split apart. At this point a local road (to Scout Green) runs between the two carriageways without a link to the motorway.

The motorway engineers here chose to follow the route of the Lancaster and Carlisle Railway engineered by Joseph Locke (now part of the West Coast Main Line) where the motorway runs in a split-level cutting above the railway in the descent from Shap Fell through the Lune Gorge into southern Cumbria.

The northbound entry slip road at Lancaster (Junction 34) was unusually short, presenting problems for traffic joining the motorway. The M6 crosses the River Lune at this point and unless the bridge had been made wider, there was no space to build a longer slip road. This junction was upgraded from an earlier emergency-vehicles-only access point, which explains the substandard design. The construction of the Heysham to M6 Link Road (The Bay Gateway) has completely re-modelled this junction with a wide additional bridge over the River Lune and other works repositioning slip roads with new acceleration lanes to modern standards.

The route was originally intended to replace the old A6, which it does along the northern section starting with the Preston Bypass. However, a much closer approximation to the overall actual route of the M6 (heading north from its southern terminus) is provided by following the A45, A34, A50, A49, then the A6. South of Preston, the A6 route is instead supplemented by the M61 as far as Manchester, with the M60 acting as a bypass around the city. South of Manchester, there is no true motorway replacement for the old road. The M1 acts as a bypass for long-distance traffic in the south, from the Kegworth junction near Nottingham, to Luton and St. Albans near London; but, it is not an alternative for local traffic as the routes diverge by more than  while passing through Northamptonshire. Across the Pennines, the old road remains the main local through-route, and long-distance fast traffic between Derby and Manchester must instead take either the A50 and M6, or M1 and M62.

Operational
In July 1972, the  Minister for Transport Industries, John Peyton, announced that  of UK motorway particularly prone to fog would benefit from lighting in a project which "should be" completed by 1973. Sections to be illuminated included the M6 between junctions 10 and 11, and between junctions 20 and 27.

In March 2006, after 15 years of debate, the government authorised the construction of a  extension of the M6 from its then northern terminus near Carlisle to the Anglo-Scottish border at Gretna (the so-called "Cumberland Gap"), where it links into the existing A74(M). The road opened on 5 December 2008, the 50th anniversary of the M6 Preston By-pass. The project, which was a mixture of new road and upgrade of the existing A74, crosses the West Coast Main Line and had an estimated costs of £174 million. It completed an uninterrupted motorway from just south of Dunblane (via the M9, the recently opened M80 section near Cumbernauld and the M73) in the north to Exeter (via the M5) and to London (via both the M42/M40 and the M1) in the south.

The M6 Toll, Britain's first toll motorway, which bypasses the West Midlands conurbation to the east and north of Birmingham and Walsall and was built to alleviate traffic congestion through the West Midlands, and opened in December 2003. Before the opening of the toll motorway, this section of the M6 carried 180,000 vehicles per day at its busiest point near Wolverhampton (between the junctions with the M54 and M5 motorways), compared with a design capacity of only 72,000 vehicles. Usage, at about 50,000 vehicles, was lower than expected and traffic levels on the M6 were only slightly reduced as a result. The high toll prices, which were set by the operating company and over which the UK Government has no influence until 2054, were blamed for the low usage. Much traffic continues to use the M6 or the continued on the M1 and took the A50 or A52.  the road between Junctions 3A and 11A now carries 120,000 motor vehicles every day.

A proposed extension to the M6 Toll known as the 'M6 Expressway', which would have continued from the M6 Toll as far as Knutsford, at which point much of the existing M6 traffic leaves the M6 for Manchester, was abandoned in 2006 due to excessive costs, anticipated construction problems and disappointing levels of use of the M6 Toll.

In October 2007, following a successful trial on the M42 in the West Midlands, the government announced that two stretches of the M6 would be upgraded to allow the hard shoulder to be used as a normal running lane during busy conditions under a scheme called active traffic management. The two stretches, between junctions 4 and 5 and between junctions 10a and 8, are two of the busiest sections on the entire motorway. It was then proposed that the system could be extended onto other stretches of the M6 while the government undertook a feasibility study to determine other likely locations for this technology to be used. The stretch between junctions 4 and 5 was completed during December 2009 while the stretch between junctions 10a and 8 was completed during March 2011. This was then followed by a stretch between junctions 5 and 8 which started construction in April 2012 and was completed in October 2014.

After plans of the government to improve reliability and capacity between Junctions 11 by Cannock and Junction 19 near Knutsford it favoured a new motorway in 2004, 'The Expressway' following a roughly parallel course to the existing M6. In July 2006, the government announced its decision to abandon the Expressway proposal, and favoured widening accompanied by demand-management measures, and launched a study to consider options for providing additional capacity. After the stretch between junction 10a and 13 was upgraded to a managed motorway in February 2016, it was then proposed to introduce a managed motorway between junction 13 and 19, later divided into two separate stretches, between junctions 16 and 19 and junctions 13 and 15. The stretch between junctions 16 and 19 started construction in December 2015 and was completed in March 2019 while construction on the stretch between junctions 13 and 15 commenced in March 2018 and was completed in August 2022.

In April 2021, the M6 gained the first motorway service station to be built for thirteen years. Located off Junction 1 at Rugby and opened on 30 April 2021, the facility, run by Moto Hospitality, includes the largest electric vehicle charging facility in the UK, run by Ecotricity and Gridserve.

Current developments

J10 improvements

Work started in 2020 to reconstruct the bridges above the motorway at junction 10, due to frequent congestion at peak times.

Junctions

Data from driver location signs are used to provide distance and carriageway identifier information. Where a junction spans several hundred metres (yards) and the start and end distances are known, both distances are shown.

Notes

Legislation

Each motorway in England requires that a legal document called a Statutory Instrument is published, detailing the route of the road, before it can be built. The dates given on these Statutory Instruments relate to when the document was published, and not when the road was built. Provided below is an incomplete list of the Statutory Instruments relating to the route of the M6.

 Statutory Instrument 1987 No. 252: County Council of West Midlands (M6 Motorway Junction 10) (Connecting Road) Scheme 1985 Confirmation Instrument 1987
 Statutory Instrument 1987 No. 2254: M6 Motorway (Catthorpe Interchange) Connecting Roads Scheme 1987
 Statutory Instrument 1990 No. 2659: M6 Motorway: Widening between Junctions 20 and 21A (Thelwall Viaduct) and Connecting Roads Scheme 1990
 Statutory Instrument 1991 No. 1873: M6 Motorway (Widening and Improvements Between Junctions 30 and 32) and Connecting Roads Scheme 1991
 Statutory Instrument 1993 No. 1370: Lancashire County Council (Proposed Connecting Roads to M6 Motorway at Haighton) Special Roads Scheme 1992 Confirmation Instrument 1993
 Statutory Instrument 1997 No. 1292: M6 Birmingham to Carlisle Motorway (At Haighton) Connecting Roads Scheme 1997
 Statutory Instrument 1997 No. 1293: M6 Birmingham To Carlisle Motorway (at Haighton) Special Roads Scheme 1997 Transfer Order 1997
 Statutory Instrument 1998 No. 125: The M6 Motorway (Saredon and Packington Diversions) Scheme 1998

See also
 List of motorways in the United Kingdom
 :Category:M6 motorway service stations
 Murder of Jacqueline Ansell-Lamb, a woman who was abducted and murdered while hitchhiking up the M6 in 1970
 The band New Model Army (band) mention the north bound M6 in their song ‘Marrakesh’ with reference to graffiti saying ‘sorry’.

Notes

References

Further reading

External links

 CBRD
 Motorway database – M6
 Histories – opening booklets, including M6 Preston Bypass
 Bad Junctions
 M6/A683
 M6/M58
 M6/A34
 Lancashire Historic Highways – a page supplied by Lancashire County Council detailing the history of the M6 in North West England, and the construction of Preston Bypass, the UK's first motorway.
 Route 6
 The Motorway Archive
 Junctions 1 to 13
 Junctions 13 to 16
 Junctions 16 to 20
 Junctions 20 to 29
 Junctions 29 to 32
 Junctions 33 to 35
 Junctions 35 to 40
 Junctions 40 to 41
 Junctions 41 to 44

 
Motorways in England
Proposed roads in the United Kingdom
Roads in Cheshire
Roads in Cumbria
Roads in Greater Manchester
Roads in the West Midlands (county)
Transport in Birmingham, West Midlands
Roads in Lancashire
Transport in Staffordshire
Roads in Warwickshire
Recipients of Civic Trust Awards